The following highways are numbered 542:

Canada
Alberta Highway 542
Manitoba Provincial Road 542
 Ontario Highway 542
 Ontario Highway 542A

Germany
Bundesautobahn 542

United States